Piero Aldair Quispe Córdova (born 14 August 2001) is a Peruvian footballer who plays as a midfielder for the Peruvian club Universitario and the Peru national team.

Career
A youth product of CD Hector Chumpitaz, Quispe moved to the youth academy of Universitario in 2017. He began his senior career with Universitario in 2021, where he played in the Peruvian Primera División. In April 2022, he signed a contract tying him with the club until 2025.

International career
Quispe debuted with the Peru national team in a 1–0 friendly win over Bolivia on 19 November 2022.

References

External links
 
 

Living people
2001 births
Footballers from Lima
Peruvian footballers
Peru international footballers
Peruvian Primera División players
Club Universitario de Deportes footballers
Association football midfielders